Benoît Minisini is a French programmer best known for programming the Gambas graphical development environment. Starting programming when he was twelve, he became interested in writing languages, compilers, assemblers, and interpreters.

This interest and a respect for the BASIC programming language caused him to create Gambas, which is inspired by Visual Basic. Benoît has said that he intended Gambas to have the best features of Visual Basic, without the numerous bugs and flaws he sees in the program and the language. Benoît has a part-time software job, studied at École Pour l'Informatique et les Techniques Avancées and lives in Paris, France.

See also
Gambas

References

External links

Benoît Minisini Interview
Benoît Minisini Meeting at FOSDEM (Spanish)
Benoît Minisini Interview (Czech)

Living people
French computer programmers
Programming language designers
Free software programmers
1973 births
BASIC programming language